Roza (Rozalia) Ismayil gizi Jalilova (born 17 May 1929, Quba) is an Azerbaijani dancer, choreographer-ballet master, Honored Artist of the USSR (1959), People's Artist of the Republic of Azerbaijan (2007), Chevalier of the "Sharaf" and “Shohrat” Orders.

Life 
Roza Jalilova was born on 17 May 1929 in Quba. In 1937, Jalilova went to the first grade of school No. 132. When she was 9 years old, her father enrolled her in the Baku School of Choreography, in the class of Sara Miraliyeva. After graduating from the Baku Choreographic School in 1945, she became a soloist of the Mirza Fatali Akhundov Opera and Ballet Theater.

Career 
In 1949, Jalilova became a soloist of the Song and Dance Ensemble of the Azerbaijan State Philharmonic Society named after Muslim Magomayev. In August 1951, Jalilova was among the artists representing the Soviet government at the 3rd World Festival of Youth and Students held in Berlin with the participation of 105 countries. For over 30 years, Jalilova has represented Azerbaijan at many international festivals that took place in Canada, China, USA, Turkey, Iraq, Ethiopia, and Morocco.

In 1965, Jalilova was appointed a leader of the dance group of the Song and Dance Ensemble, leaving the group in 1974. In various years, she organized folk groups in Nakhchivan, Shamakhi, Jabrail, Saatly and Lankaran.

In 1989, Jalilova created the "Gulistan" song and dance ensemble, and then the "Sevinj" ensemble. In 1991, "Gulistan" became the first Azerbaijani dance group to visit the United States.

For many years, Jalilova worked as a teacher of the Arts Gymnasium at the Azerbaijan National Conservatory, educating many famous dancers.

In 2019, President of the Azerbaijan Ilham Aliyev signed an order on awarding with the Shohrat Order for her merits in the development and promotion of Azerbaijani dance art.

Personal life 
In 1956, Jalilova got married and gave birth to her son Zahid the same year.

Awards and honors 

 Honored Artist of the USSR, 1959 
 People's Artist of Azerbaijan, 2007
 Sharaf Order
Shohrat Order, 2019
In 2014, a festive evening dedicated to the 85th anniversary of Jalilova was held at the Azerbaijan State Philharmonic Society in Baku, and in 2019, a gala evening dedicated to the 90th anniversary of Jalilova was held there too.

References

1929 births
Living people
Azerbaijani dancers
Recipients of the Shohrat Order
People's Artists of Azerbaijan
Recipients of the Sharaf Order
Azerbaijani female dancers